Derek Roszell Bryant is a former professional baseball player. He attended Henry Clay High School in Lexington KY as well as the University of Kentucky.

Career
Bryant spent his entire career, from 1973 until 1981, in the Athletics organization. During his lone big league season, he batted .179 with three extra base hits in 108 at bats.

During spring training for the 1980 season, he was cut on the field by newly installed manager Billy Martin, who had evidently believed was Glenn Burke (who Martin described as a "[m---------ing] homosexual"). Bryant never managed to make it up in the Athletics organization or the majors again.
 
Bryant has managed in the Mexican League on and off since 1988, mostly with the Sultanes de Monterrey (1988, 1995–98, 2001–02). In 1999, he managed the High Desert Mavericks in the Arizona Diamondbacks farm system. After his last stint with Monterrey, Bryant has managed the Acereros de Monclova (2003), the Saraperos de Saltillo (2004–07, 2012), the Vaqueros Laguna (2009–10) and the Olmecas de Tabasco (2012).

References

Sources

1951 births
Living people
African-American baseball managers
African-American baseball players
Alijadores de Tampico players
American expatriate baseball players in Canada
American expatriate baseball players in Mexico
Arizona Diamondbacks scouts
Astros de Tampico players
Baseball players from Lexington, Kentucky
Birmingham A's players
Burlington Bees players
Chattanooga Lookouts players
Chicago White Sox scouts
Caribbean Series managers
Kentucky Wildcats baseball players
Major League Baseball outfielders
Mexican Baseball Hall of Fame inductees
Mexican League baseball managers
Minor league baseball managers
Oakland Athletics players
Ogden A's players
San Jose Missions players
Sportspeople from Lexington, Kentucky
Sultanes de Monterrey players
Tacoma Tigers players
Tigres del México players
Tomateros de Culiacán players
University of Kentucky alumni
Vancouver Canadians players
21st-century African-American people
20th-century African-American sportspeople